Kambaladinne is a small village in the state of Andhra Pradesh in India.

References 

Villages in Prakasam district